Enzo Martín Roldán (born 7 December 2000) is an Argentine footballer currently playing as a midfielder for Unión de Santa Fe.

Career statistics

Club

References

2000 births
Living people
People from Villa Mercedes, San Luis
Argentine footballers
Association football midfielders
Argentine Primera División players
Boca Juniors footballers
Unión de Santa Fe footballers